Horodyshche Raion was a raion (district) of Cherkasy Oblast, central Ukraine. Its administrative centre was located at the town of Horodyshche. The raion was abolished on 18 July 2020 as part of the administrative reform of Ukraine, which reduced the number of raions of Cherkasy Oblast to four. The area of Horodyshche Raion was split between Cherkasy Raion and Zvenyhorodka Raion. The last estimate of the raion population was 

At the time of disestablishment, the raion consisted of three hromadas:
 Horodyshche urban hromada with the administration in Horodyshche, transferred to Cherkasy Raion;
 Mlyiv rural hromada with the administration in the selo of Mlyiv, transferred to Cherkasy Raion;
 Vilshana settlement hromada with the administration in the urban-type settlement of Vilshana, transferred to Zvenyhorodka Raion.

References

Former raions of Cherkasy Oblast
1923 establishments in Ukraine
Ukrainian raions abolished during the 2020 administrative reform